V C Kulandaiswamy (14 July 1929 – 10 December 2016) was an Indian academic and author. He completed his Bachelor of engineering in Civil at Government College of Technology, Coimbatore. He obtained his Master of Technology degree from IIT Kharagpur and obtained a PhD in hydrology and water resources from the University of Illinois at Urbana-Champaign (United States).

Kulandaiswamy created an eponymous mathematical model for the rainfall-runoff relationship based on a general equation developed by him. Kulandaiswamy was a member of the UNESCO planning group (1978) for the preparation of the second six-year plan (1981–86) of the International Hydraulic Programme (IHP). He has authored more than 60 research reports and papers in the field of hydrology. He has authored six volumes of poems and seven of prose essays which earned him the Thiruvalluvar Award by Tamil Nadu government in 1999. He has received the Padma Bhushan (2002) and Padma Shri (1992), awarded by the president of India.

He worked for reform of Tamil script to make learning Tamil easier. He won the Sahitya Akademi Award (1988) for his book Vaazhum Valluvam. He died on 10 December 2016 after a short illness.

References

1929 births
2016 deaths
Scientists from Tamil Nadu
Tamil scholars
Tamil poets
Recipients of the Padma Bhushan in science & engineering
Recipients of the Padma Shri in literature & education
Recipients of the Sahitya Akademi Award in Tamil
IIT Kharagpur alumni
Indian Tamil academics
People from Karur district
20th-century Indian educators
Indian hydrologists